Luo Tianyi is a Chinese Vocaloid developed formerly by Bplats, Inc. under the Yamaha Corporation, and was created in collaboration with Shanghai Henian Information Technology Co. Ltd. she was released for the Vocaloid 3 and Vocaloid 4 engines. Her voice is provided by the Chinese voice actress Shan Xin. Considered China's most popular virtual idol, she held a joint concert with pianist Lang Lang at the Shanghai's Mercedes-Benz Arena in March 2019.

Development
To create strong support for the first Chinese Vocaloid, a contest was held to pick the most popular design. The winning entry would become a Vocaloid, while the runner up entries were included in the Vocaloid promotions.

The winner of the contest was named Yayin Gongyu and their entry became Tianyi's design. The first song by Luo Tianyi was "Step on Your Heart".

Additional software
On April 2, 2012, Shan Xin confirmed that she had just finished her second day of recording the voicebank and mentioned that she had done an interview with Japanese reporters. According to her report, she recorded in the "Japanese way," which led to a fan asking if it would be a Japanese or Chinese voicebank. Shan Xin responded by stating to wait for the announcement.  Her Japanese voicebank was not yet finished at the time of Yanhe's development, however, they mentioned that they hoped to have her released soon. Later, in November 2013, it was confirmed the vocal was cancelled.

Tianyi's Vocaloid 4 production was officially announced on March 12, 2016. Her original vocal would be improved and it was confirmed that she would be receiving at least one additional vocal. However, the name of it was not revealed at the time and it was unknown if she was receiving any more vocals. She was eventually released on December 30, 2017 with two voicebanks, "Meng" (normal) and "Ning" (power), along with two Japanese voicebanks released on May 18, 2018, Normal and Sweet.

It is also likely that she would be updated to Vocaloid 5 with Yuezheng Ling and Yanhe.

Characteristics
She has a pet called "Tian Dian" and according to her biography is an Angel sent to bring happiness via music to the world like the Vocaloids of the past.

Luo Tianyi has also been co-opted as youth ambassador of the Chinese Communist Youth League.

Major offline performances
On February 2, 2016, Tianyi was invited to perform on the Little New Year (a traditional festival in China that is celebrated six or seven days before the Lunar New Year) Gala held by Hunan Satellite TV and sang the song "Huaer Naji" (花儿纳吉) with Yang Yuying. In the performance Tianyi's figure was shown to the audience with the help of augmented reality. It was also her first performance on TV.

On June 17, 2017, Tianyi and five other virtual singers (Yanhe, Yuezheng Ling, Yuezheng Longya, Zhiyu Moke and Mo Qingxian) held a concert at the Mercedes-Benz Arena in Shanghai. Henian used the Holography technology to show their figures. It was the first concert that was specially held for Chinese virtual figures.

And on New Year's Eve of 2018, Tianyi participated in the New Year's Eve Gala of Jiangsu Television. She sang the song "Let It Go" with the Hong Kong singer Wakin Chau.

In March 2018, Tianyi appeared on China Central Television for the first time and performed with the Peking opera master Wang Peiyu.

On November 3, 2018, the concert "Guofeng Jiyue Ye" (国风极乐夜) was held at the Beijing National Stadium, where Tianyi sang the opening song of the concert.

On December 31, 2018, Tianyi performed on Jiangsu Television's New Year Gala for the second time. This time she sang the song "Dalabengba" (达拉崩吧) with Joker Xue.

On February 23, 2019, Tianyi and the pianist Lang Lang hold a joint concert at the Mercedes-Benz Arena in Shanghai.

On May 16, 2019, Tianyi appeared on Zhejiang Television's the treasured voice and sang "Mangzhong" (芒种) together with Angela Chang.

See also
 List of Vocaloid products

References

External links
 Luo Tianyi - YouTube

Vocaloids introduced in 2012
Fictional singers